Lisa Kolb (born 4 May 2001) is an Austrian footballer who plays as a forward for Frauen-Bundesliga club SC Freiburg and the Austria women's national team.

Club career
Kolb has played for Neulengbach in Austria.

International career
Kolb capped for the Austria national team at senior level during the UEFA Women's Euro 2022 qualifying.

References

External links
 

2001 births
Living people
People from Gmunden
Footballers from Upper Austria
Austrian women's footballers
Women's association football forwards
Austria women's international footballers
ÖFB-Frauenliga players
SV Neulengbach (women) players
SC Freiburg (women) players
Austrian expatriate women's footballers
Expatriate women's footballers in Germany
Austrian expatriate sportspeople in Germany